Amphitheatre Lake may refer to:

 Amphitheater Lake, Wyoming, U.S.
 Amphitheatre Lake (Antarctica)
 Amphitheatre Lake (Vancouver Island), lake on Vancouver Island, Canada